In psychoanalytic theory, narcissistic supply is a pathological or excessive need for attention or admiration from codependents, or such a need in the orally fixated, that does not take into account the feelings, opinions or preferences of other people.

The concept was introduced by Otto Fenichel in 1938, to describe a type of admiration, interpersonal support or sustenance drawn by an individual from his or her environment and essential to their self-esteem.

History 
Building on Freud's concept of narcissistic satisfaction and on the work of his colleague the psychoanalyst Karl Abraham, Fenichel highlighted the narcissistic need in early development for supplies to enable young children to maintain a sense of mental equilibrium. He identified two main strategies for obtaining such narcissistic supplies—aggression and ingratiation—contrasting styles of approach which could later develop into the sadistic and the submissive respectively.

A childhood loss of essential supplies was for Fenichel key to a depressive disposition, as well as to a tendency to seek compensatory narcissistic supplies thereafter. Impulse neuroses, addictions including love addiction and gambling, were all seen by him as products of the struggle for supplies in later life. Psychoanalyst Ernst Simmel (1920) had earlier considered neurotic gambling as an attempt to regain primitive love and attention in an adult context.

Personality disorders 
Psychoanalyst Otto Kernberg considered the malignant narcissistic criminal to be coldly characterised by a disregard of others unless they could be idealised as sources of narcissistic supply. Self psychologist Heinz Kohut saw those with narcissistic personality disorder as disintegrating mentally when cut off from a regular source of narcissistic supply. Those providing supply to such figures may be treated as if they are a part of the narcissist, in an eclipse of all personal boundaries.

Functions in narcissistic pathology 
In their adolescence, the narcissist internalises a "bad" recipient (usually their parent). They regard feelings that are socially discouraged towards this recipient, including types of aggression such as hatred and envy, among others. These perceptions reinforce the self-image of the narcissist as immoral and corrupt. They eventually create a feeling of self-worth that is dysfunctional. Their self-confidence and self-image become unrealistically low and distorted. In an attempt to repress these "bad" feelings, the narcissist also suppresses all emotions. Their aggression is channeled into fantasies or outlets that are socially lawful like extreme sports, gambling, reckless driving, and shopping. The narcissist sees the environment as a place that is hostile, unstable, unfulfilling, morally wrong, and unpredictable.

Narcissists generally have no inherent sense of self-worth, so they rely on other people, via attention or narcissistic supply, to re-affirm their importance in order to feel good about themselves and maintain their self-esteem. They then turn other people into operations or objects in such a way that others do not pose any emotional threat. This reactive pattern is pathological narcissism.

The narcissist projects a false self to elicit a constant stream of attention or narcissistic supply from others. The false self is an unreal façade or cover they show to the world that involves what the narcissist intends to be seen as - powerful, elegant, smart, wealthy, or well-connected. The narcissist then 'collects' reactions to this projected false self from their environment, which may consist of their spouse, family, friends, colleagues, business partners, and peers. If the expected narcissistic supply (adulation, admiration, attention, fear, respect, applause, or affirmation) is not forthcoming – they are demanded or extorted by the narcissist. Money, compliments, a media appearance, a sexual conquest are all merely different forms of the same thing to a narcissist - narcissistic supply.

Sources 
The attention they receive from the "supply source" is essential to the narcissist's survival, without it they would die (physically or metaphorically) because their fragile ego depends on it to handle their unstable self-esteem. There are distinctive forms of narcissistic supply to attain them with two separate sources. Scholars and researchers generally recognise two main kinds of narcissistic supply: primary, acquired through more publicly directed forms of attention, and secondary, generally acquired through attention attained through interpersonal relationships.

Primary 
The primary narcissistic supply is based on attention in both its public forms such as recognition, fame, infamy, stardom, and its private, more interpersonal, types of praise, admiration, applause, fear, and repulsion. It is crucial to realise that the primary narcissistic supply represents attention of any kind–positive or negative. Their "realisations" may be imaginary, fictional, or only evident to the narcissist, as long as others believe in them. Appearances qualify more than the content; it is not the truth that matters, but their perception of it. Therefore, as long as they receive the expected reaction or attention that they had projected through their false self, the connotation attached to it is inconsequential.

Triggers 
A main narcissistic supply trigger is an individual or object that causes the source to provide narcissistic supply by confronting the source with information about the false self of the narcissist. Narcissistic supply is the source's response to the trigger. If the false self is projecting admiration and the narcissist finds an environment that feeds into their need, then it becomes a trigger of primary narcissistic supply.

Publicity (celebrity or notoriety, being renowned or being notorious) is a narcissistic supply trigger because it causes individuals to pay attention to the narcissist, thus moving sources to provide narcissistic supply to the narcissist. Publicity can be acquired through exposure, creation of something, or by provoking attention. The narcissist continually resorts to all three, much like what drug addicts are doing to guarantee their regular dose. One such cause of narcissistic supply is a partner or a companion.

Secondary 
Secondary narcissistic supply involves projecting the image that they live a good life (a worthy cause of pride for the narcissist), maintaining a safe existence (financial security, personal acceptability, upward growth), and acquiring companionship. Thus, having a partner, possessing significant property, being creative, operating a company (converted into a pathological narcissistic space), having a feeling of anarchic liberty, being a part of a community or society, having a skilled or other reputation, being prosperous, owning land and displaying one's status signs-all represent secondary narcissistic supply as well. Whatever would be a status symbol in the community of friends of the narcissist and would be considered a secondary source as achievement in that community. Secondary supply is about the overall image that the lives of the narcissist brings to their friends and relatives. However, if it is to endure, this type of supply requires to be positive, any display of negativity would end up hurting the person, no matter who they may be. It is this type of supply that is also the reserve source for short primary narcissistic supply. However, the narcissist uses both in much the same manner.

See also

References

Citations

Sources 

 

 

Narcissism
Psychoanalytic terminology
Attachment theory